

Home media

VHS

United States

United Kingdom

Laserdisc

United States

Japanese

DVD

United States

United Kingdom

Blu-ray

United States

Videogames

Albums

Other Albums

Comics 
 New Funnies (1942) (Dell)
 Walter Lantz New Funnies (1946) (Dell)
 Walter Lantz Andy Panda (1952) (Dell)
 Walter Lantz Woody Woodpecker (1952) (Dell)
 Woody Woodpecker's Back to School (1952) (Dell)
 Woody Woodpecker Meets Scotty MacTape (1953) (St)
 Woody Woodpecker in Chevrolet Wonderland (1954) (Western Publishing.)
 Woody Woodpecker's Country Fair (1956) (Dell)
 Woody Woodpecker Tells You How to Win Big Prizes (1956) (Western Publishing.)
 Walter Lantz Woody Woodpecker (1962) (Gold Key)
 Walter Lantz Space Mouse (1962) (Gold Key)
 Walter Lantz Woody Woodpecker Summer Fun (1966) (Gold Key)
 Woody Woodpecker and the Meteor Menace (1967)
 Woody Woodpecker: The Sinister Signal (1969)
 Walter Lantz Woody Woodpecker Christmas Parade (1969) (Gold Key)
 Golden Comics Digest (1969) (Gold Key)
 Walter Lantz Woody Woodpecker (1974) (Rosnock)
 Woody Woodpecker (1977) (Condor Verlag)
 Woody Woodpecker (1991) (Harvey)
 Woody Woodpecker and Friends (1991) (Harvey)
 Woody Woodpecker 50th Anniversary Special (1991) (Harvey)
 Woody Woodpecker Summer Special (1993) (Harvey)

Books 
 Woody Woodpecker: Big Game Hunter (1950) (Whitman)
 Woody Woodpecker Shoots the Works (1951) (Walter Lantz Productions)
 Woody Woodpecker's Pogo Stick Adventures (1954) (Whitman)
 Woody Woodpecker Takes a Trip (1961) (A Little Golden Book)
 Woody Woodpecker and the Meteor Menace (1967) (Big Little Book)
 Woody Woodpecker at The Circus (1976) (A Little Golden Book)
 Woody Woodpecker and the Busy Beavers (1967) (Big Little Book)
 Woody Woodpecker at Sinister Signal (1969) (Big Little Book)
 Woody Woodpecker: The Pirate Treasure (1977) (Walter Lantz)
 Woody Woodpecker and the Pumpkin Pie (1983) (Badger Books)
 Woody Woodpecker goes Keep-Fit Crazy (1983) (Badger Books)
 Woody Woodpecker and the Snowmobile Rescue (1983) (Badger Books)
 Woody Woodpecker and the Trash-Can Trumpet (1983) (Badger Books)
 How To Draw Woody Woodpecker And Friends (1983) (A Golden Book)
 Woody's First Dictionary (1988) (Grosset & Dunlap)

Clothing 
 Woody Woodpecker from Universal Studios (Shirt) by American Classic Apparel Company - 1993

Party Stuffs 
 Woody Woodpecker (Cinterpiece Birthday Decoration) by Reeds - 1978
 Woody Woodpecker (Valentine Sticker Card) by Mello Smello - 1999

Posters 
 Woody Woodpecker, Andy Panda and Chilly Willy (Posters) by Posters International - 1992 (exclusive in Canada)

Pins 
 Woody Woodpecker (Brooch Pin) - 1979
 Woody Woodpecker, Andy Panda, Miranda Panda, Oswald, Chilly Willy and Gabby Gator (6 Sealed Button Pins) - 1980

House Stuffs 
 Woody Woodpecker (Ceramic Coffee Mug) by Three Cheers from Applause - 1983
 Woody Woodpecker (Coffee Mug) by Universal Studios - 1991
 Woody Woodpecker, Winnie Woodpecker, Chilly Willy and Andy Panda (Coffee Mug) by Universal Studios Florida - 1996
 Woody Woodpecker and Friends (Coffee Mug) by Universal Studios - 1996

School Supplies 
 Woody Woodpecker (Lunchbox with Thermos by Walter Lantz Productions) - 1957
 Woody Woodpecker (Lunchbox by Aladdin Industries Inc.) - 1971
 Woody Woodpecker (Metal Lunchbox) - 1999

Toys

1956 
 Travel with Woody Woodpecker (Cadaco)

1958 
 Woody Woodpecker Board Game (Milton Bradley)

1964 
 Woody Woodpecker Card Game (E. E. Fairchild Corporation)
 The Woody Woodpecker Show (View Master 3D - GAF)

1969 
 Woody Woodpecker's Up the Tree Game (Whitman)

1972 
 Woody Woodpecker's Crazy Mixed-Up Color Factory Game (Whitman)

1975 
 Woody Woodpecker and his Friends (A Pepys Game)

1976 
 Woody Woodpecker's Moon Dash (Whitman)

1977 
 Woody Woodpecker's Baja Rally (Whitman)
 Woody Woodpecker (View Master 3D - GAF)

1980 
 Woody Woodpecker's Great Newspaper Chase (Whitman)

1982 
 Woody Woodpecker Bop Bag (LarGo Toys)
 Woody Woodpecker Frame Tray Puzzle (Whitman)

1987 
 Woody Woodpecker Figurine (by Applause)

1991 
 The Woody Woodpecker Show (View Master 3D - Tyco)

1998 
 Woody Woodpecker (Carl's Jr.)

1999 
 Woody Woodpecker (Burger King's Happy Meal)

2018 
 Woody Woodpecker (Funko Pop)

References 

merchadise
Merchandise